Pochepsky District is an administrative and municipal district (raion), one of the twenty-seven in Bryansk Oblast, Russia. It is located in the center of the oblast. Its administrative center is the town of Pochep. As of the 2021 Census, the total population of the district was 34,971, with the population of Pochep accounting for 42.9% of that number.

History
The district was established in 1929 within Western Oblast. When Bryansk Oblast was created on July 5, 1944, the district became a part of it.

References

Notes

Sources

Districts of Bryansk Oblast
